Echinophryne mitchellii, also known as the spinycoat anglerfish, the long-spined anglerfish, or Mitchell's frogfish, is a species of fish in the family Antennariidae. It is endemic to southern Australia, where it ranges from Wilsons Promontory, Victoria, to Tasmania. It is a benthic species found in inshore temperate reef environments at a depth of 30 to 70 m (98 to 230 ft). The species reaches 11.1 cm (4.4 inches) SL and is reported to be oviparous.

References 

Antennariidae
Taxa described in 1897
Fish of Australia